Sawer is a village in the Punjab province of Pakistan. It is located at 33°5'45N 72°38'21E with an altitude of 394 metres (1295 feet).

References

Villages in Punjab, Pakistan